Wilber Renteria Cuero (born 6 February 1992) is a professional Colombian footballer who last played for Correcaminos UAT

References

External links
 

1992 births
Living people
Colombian footballers
Colombian expatriate footballers
Association football midfielders
Deportes Quindío footballers
Universitario Popayán footballers
Ocelotes UNACH footballers
Potros UAEM footballers
Club Atlético Zacatepec players
Cimarrones de Sonora players
Atlante F.C. footballers
Correcaminos UAT footballers
Categoría Primera A players
Categoría Primera B players
Ascenso MX players
Liga Premier de México players
Colombian expatriate sportspeople in Mexico
Expatriate footballers in Mexico
Sportspeople from Valle del Cauca Department